Chajka (Czajka) (d. after 14 November 1781), mistress of the Polish king Stanisław August Poniatowski. She was a Pole of Jewish ancestry.

She was daughter of the Jewish merchant Abramek Lwowski (Abramek of Lwów) and lived in Żwaniec. In 1781, she was painted by Krzysztof Radzwiłłowski. Czajka had a daughter named Elia (Ella).

See also
 Esterka
 Paradisus Judaeorum

Sources

Mistresses of Stanisław August Poniatowski
18th-century Polish Jews
Jewish concubines